An annular solar eclipse occurred on September 11, 1988. A solar eclipse occurs when the Moon passes between Earth and the Sun, thereby totally or partly obscuring the image of the Sun for a viewer on Earth. An annular solar eclipse occurs when the Moon's apparent diameter is smaller than the Sun's, blocking most of the Sun's light and causing the Sun to look like an annulus (ring). An annular eclipse appears as a partial eclipse over a region of the Earth thousands of kilometres wide. Annularity was visible in southeastern Somalia (including the capital city Mogadishu), the Indian Ocean and Macquarie Island of Australia.

Related eclipses

Eclipses of 1988 
 A penumbral lunar eclipse on March 3.
 A total solar eclipse on March 18.
 A partial lunar eclipse on August 27.
 An annular solar eclipse on September 11.

Solar eclipses of 1986–1989

Saros 144 

It is a part of Saros cycle 144, repeating every 18 years, 11 days, containing 70 events. The series started with partial solar eclipse on April 11, 1736. It contains annular eclipses from July 7, 1880 through August 27, 2565. There are no total eclipses in the series. The series ends at member 70 as a partial eclipse on May 5, 2980. The longest duration of annularity will be 9 minutes, 52 seconds on December 29, 2168.
<noinclude>

Inex series

Metonic series

Notes

References

1988 9 11
1988 in science
1988 9 11
September 1988 events